Daubney is a surname. Notable people with the surname include:

David Daubney (born 1947), former MP, head of the Ottawa Public Library Foundation Board of Directors
John E. Daubney (1919–2003), Irish Catholic mayor of St. Paul, Minnesota, 1952–1954
Martin Daubney (born 1970), the longest serving editor of Loaded magazine

See also
Hinton Daubney, small hamlet in Hampshire, England, located between Catherington and Hambledon
Daubeny (disambiguation)